Andrew Baron (born 1962) is a self-taught, award-winning paper engineer and singled out by Robert Sabuda, a leading children's pop-up book artist, as a wunderkind of pull tabs, specific devices used to cause movement in pop-up books.

Biography
Baron was awarded the Movable Book Society's Meggendorfer Prize for Best Paper Engineering in 2004 for Knick-Knack Paddywhack!  The book, by Paul O. Zelinsky, has “200 movable parts, 300 glue points – twice the usual number – 15 lift-the-flaps, and 10 parts on the last spread alone, moving simultaneously with one tab!... 500 people [at the Hua Yang Printing Company in China] worked on the book." Of this book, Robert Sabuda noted, "his designs are unique, complex, thoughtful and he doesn't skimp on the amount of paper or rivets needed to accomplish an action."

Baron has also repaired and restored old clocks, music boxes, radios and typewriters since childhood. In 2007, Baron spent about 70 hours repairing the "Draughtsman-Writer" automaton by Henri Maillardet (1745–1830). A version of Maillardet’s automaton, a self-powered robot that writes poetry and draws four different images, was in Martin Scorsese’s movie Hugo and Brian Selznick’s book The Invention of Hugo Cabret.

Selected bibliography

Exhibitions

External links
 Official Andrew Baron Website  http://popyrus.com/
 Video lecture, The Birth of a Corporate Pop-Up Book, given at the National Museum of American History, on April 18, 2011, as part of the Smithsonian Institution Libraries Paper Engineering Lecture Series.
 The Baron of Santa Fe, a studio interview with Baron, by Adie C. Pena, 2001

References

Living people
1962 births
Pop-up book artists